Asperjoc is a former commune in the Ardèche department in the Auvergne-Rhône-Alpes region of southern France. On 1 January 2019, it was merged into the new commune Vallées-d'Antraigues-Asperjoc.

The inhabitants of the commune are known as Asperjocois.

Geography
Asperjoc is located some 2 km north by north-west of Aubenas and 18 km west by south-west of Privas. Access to the commune is by the D 578 road from Antraigues-sur-Volane in the north which passes down the eastern border of the commune and continues south to Vals-les-Bains. The D 243 branches off the D 578 in the south of the commune and goes north-west through the commune and continues to Labastide-sur-Bésorgues. The commune has no village called Asperjoc but has several hamlets: les Beaumelles, la Brugeyre, le Chastelas, le Fau, Laulagnet, le Pont de Bridou, le Pont de l-Huile, la Praye, le Raccourci, le Rigaudel, Thieure, Tras Chabanne et la Valette inférieure. The commune is rugged and alpine in nature with little or no arable land.

The Volane river forms the entire eastern border of the commune as it flows south to join the Ardèche south of Vals-les-Bains. The Besorgues flows from the north-west of the commune south-east forming part of the western border of the commune and gathering many tributaries in the commune before joining the Volane at the southern corner.

Neighbouring communes and villages

Administration

List of Successive Mayors

Demography

Distribution of Age Groups

The population of the town is relatively old. The ratio of persons above the age of 60 years (22.3%) is higher than the national average (21.6%) but lower than the departmental average (28.1%). As for national and departmental allocations, the male population of the town is less than the female population (48.8% against 48.4% nationally and 48.2% at the departmental level).

Percentage Distribution of Age Groups in Asperjoc and Ardèche Department in 2010

Sources:
Evolution and Structure of the population of the Commune in 2010, INSEE.
Evolution and Structure of the population of the Department in 2010, INSEE.

Sites and monuments
Church from the 19th century
La Chaise du Diable waterfall

See also
Communes of the Ardèche department

References

External links

Asperjoc on Géoportail, National Geographic Institute (IGN) website 
Asprejoc on the 1750 Cassini Map

Former communes of Ardèche
States and territories disestablished in 2019